Franchise validation is the process of interviewing franchise owners by someone who is interested in investing in that franchise.  It is a best practice for prospective franchise owners.  

During the validation process, the prospect franchisee conducts Interviews with current franchise owners.  As an alternative, there are  companies and consultants that provide validation services for  prospective owners..

Self validation 

For prospective franchisees doing their own valuation, the first step is to contact the franchise owners.  

 A complete list of current franchises must be listed in a franchise's Franchise Disclosure Document (FDD). 
 In addition, some franchises provide a list of franchise owners. 

Contacting franchises can be a time-consuming and frustrating experience because franchisees are typically busy people. As a consequence, many prospective owners drop the validation process.  However, once contacted, many franchisees will openly and honestly share the lessons they've learned.

A prospect should expect some negative feedback from franchise owners in interview. These perspectives can help prospects identify potential pitfalls and set appropriate expectations. 

Some of the topics for a franchisee interview include:

 Training programs and opening support - Determine how well the initial training programs and support through getting the first unit opened prepared the franchisees for opening and running their business.
 Ongoing training and support - How effective is the ongoing support services of the franchisor in terms of helping franchises deal with problems that come up in the running of their business.
 Advertising, marketing and promotional programs - Most franchisors collect marketing dollars from every franchisee into a pool that is spent to promote the brand. Determine whether the franchisees are happy and supportive of the way this process is handled. This is typically the area that generates the most complaints.
 Quality of products or services – Determine if the franchisees are happy with the quality of the services and/or products offered through the franchisor.
 Franchisor/franchisee relations - Determine how the franchisees feel about the franchisor in general. Is the franchisor supportive, knowledgeable, responsive, accessible, organized, and trustworthy?
 Financial health – Some franchisees will be guarded about revealing financial details of their operation but others will be open. Is the franchisee meeting his financial expectations? How much is his total investment in the business and over what time period? How long before they reached break-even? How many hours per week does the franchisee work in the business?

Validation services and consultants 

It can be difficult to get a hold of enough franchisees to gather enough information for a proper validation process. Many franchise systems recognize this and hire third party validation services to assist their prospects through this stage. 

These validation services survey existing franchisees about their satisfaction on a wide variety of topics and publish the results. Typically the information provided by the service answers many questions for the prospect who can then focus energies finding answers to more specific questions, saving time and effort with all parties involved.  Be certain to review the methodology used by the research company before using the data for making decisions.

There are franchise consultants who as part of their services will arrange for phone calls with franchisees not presented by the franchisors. Generally franchisors will facilitate introductions to franchisees that our performing well and have a positive working relationship with the franchisor. A consultant can also arrange phone calls with franchisees who have left the system due to non-renewal (after the initial franchise term), closed location or sold their franchise to someone else. Speaking to current franchises and former franchises is important for franchises especially those that are investing a significant amount of capital into the franchise.

External links 
Franchise Business Review's Franchise Buying Advice
Franchise Talk Radio Show Topic: Choosing a Franchise

Franchising